Lekana  is a district in the Plateaux Region of the Republic of the Congo. The capital lies at Lekana.

Towns and villages
 
 
Onianva

Plateaux Department (Republic of the Congo)
Districts of the Republic of the Congo